was a railway station in Miki, Hyōgo Prefecture, Japan.

Lines
Miki Railway
Miki Line - Abandoned on April 1, 2008

Adjacent stations

|-
!colspan=5|Miki Railway (Abandoned)

Railway stations in Hyōgo Prefecture
Defunct railway stations in Japan
Railway stations closed in 2008